Santiago Andrés Cafiero (born 30 August 1979) is an Argentine political scientist and politician, serving as Minister of Foreign Affairs and Worship in the cabinet of President Alberto Fernández since 2021. Previously, from 2019 to 2021, he was Cabinet Chief in Fernández's government.

Early life and education
Santiago Andrés Cafiero was born on 30 August 1979 in San Isidro, in Buenos Aires Province, son of Juan Pablo Cafiero, who was Minister of Social Development during the presidency of Fernando de la Rúa in 2001, and María Luisa Bianchi. Cafiero's grandfather Antonio Cafiero held many important political posts, including the governorship of Buenos Aires, and also briefly served as Chief of the Cabinet of Ministers under Eduardo Camaño.

He began his political activism in the Peronist Youth in San Isidro. Cafiero studied political science at the University of Buenos Aires Faculty of Social Sciences, and then went on to receive a Master's Degree on public policy from Torcuato di Tella University.

Political career
Cafiero was elected president of the local Justicialist Party in his native San Isidro in 2008, and was the party's mayoral candidate in 2011 and 2015. From 2009 to 2017, he was a councillor in San Isidro's municipal council.

During the governorship of Daniel Scioli in Buenos Aires, Cafiero worked as a consultant in the Undersecretariat of Municipal Affairs (2007–2008), and then went on to serve as the Province's Director of Industry from 2008 to 2010, Undersecretary of Industry, Commerce and Mining from 2010 to 2011, Vice-minister of Social Development and Undersecretary of Social Policies from 2011 to 2014, and Undersecretary of Modernization from 2014 to 2015.

Cafiero was Florencio Randazzo's campaign chief in Randazzo's 2017 senatorial run.

Ahead of the 2019 general election, Alberto Fernández, the Justicialist Party's presidential candidate, appointed Cafiero as his campaign chief and formed the Grupo Callao think tank alongside him.

On 29 October 2019, Fernández won the presidential election in the first round with 48.2% of the vote. On 6 December 2019, in the official announcement of his incoming cabinet's composition, President-elect Fernández named Cafiero as his Cabinet Chief, a post he assumed on 10 December 2019. 

On 20 September 2021, Cafiero was appointed as Minister of Foreign Affairs and Worship in replacement of Felipe Solá, and was replaced as Cabinet Chief by Juan Manzur. Manzur's appointment and Cafiero's designation as Foreign Minister were part of a cabinet reshuffle following the government's poor showings in the 2021 legislative primary elections.

Personal life
Cafiero is married and has four sons and one daughter. He co-founded the Punto de Encuentro ("Meeting Point") publishing house in 2015.

References

External links

Profile at the official website of the Argentine Foreign Ministry (in Spanish)

Punto de Encuentro (in Spanish)

|-

1979 births
Argentine people of Italian descent
Argentine political scientists
Justicialist Party politicians
Chiefs of Cabinet of Ministers of Argentina
Foreign ministers of Argentina
Living people
People from San Isidro, Buenos Aires
University of Buenos Aires alumni